Lovely Writer: The Series (Nubsib Will Kiss), is a Thai television series starring Noppakao Dechaphatthanakun (Kao) and Poompat Iam-samang (Up).

Directed by Bundit Sintanaparadee and produced by Good Feeling and Dee Tuk Wan 2019 together with Dee Hup House, the series is first broadcast on Channel 3 before appearing on the official YouTube channel a week later.

The series is adapted from a novel, "นับสิบจะจูบ" (Nap Sip Cha Chup). The main characters, Gene and Nubsib, share a deep connection and need to navigate the demands of the boys' love business in which they're both involved.

Because of its massive popularity among nearby Asian countries, the series created a special episode namely Lovely Writer Special Episode: 2 Years of Love, 2gether or Not? which focused on the relationship between Nubsib and Gene two years after the scenes of its parent story.

It was featured on Teen Vogue's best BL dramas of 2021 list.

Synopsis 
Gene (Poompat Iam-samang) is a writer (known by his pen name Wizard) who wants to publish a new dark fantasy novel. But it turns out that the head of the publishing house wants him to write a novel in the Boys' Love genre. After the success of his first novel, he is pressured to write another book in the same genre despite his discomfort with it.

He then finds out that one of his novels entitled Bad Engineer will be adapted into an TV series, and he is invited to give his opinion during the casting for the main roles of the series. There, he meets Nubsib (Noppakao Dechaphatthanakun) who auditioned for the series and caught Gene's attention. In the following days, their paths cross again when Nubsib's manager Tum asks if Nubsib can live at Gene's apartment until he can find him permanent lodging while the series is being filmed. Gene decides to let Nubsib stay for one month. With Nubsib at Gene's apartment, their feelings become deeper, laced with unlocked secrets, revelations, jealousy and romance. Will their love have an happily ever after just like in his novels?

Cast and characters 
Below are the cast of the series:

Main 
 Noppakao Dechaphatthanakun as Nubsib
 Poompat Iam-samang as Gene

Supporting 
 Wasin Panunaporn (Kenji) as Hin
 Sirikorn Kananuruk (Bruce) as Aey
 Prarunyu Sooksamram (Ken) as Tum
 Natharuetai Akkarakijwattanakul (Zorzo) as Tiffy
 Suppacheep Chanapai (Chap) as Saymork

References

External links 
 
 Channel 3

Thai romantic drama television series
Channel 3 (Thailand) original programming
Thai boys' love television series
2010s LGBT-related drama television series